"Partyman" is a song by American musician Prince from his 1989 Batman album, and the follow-up to his number one hit, "Batdance". The song is one of the few on the album to be prominently featured in the film, accompanying the scene in which the Joker and his minions deface exhibits in the Gotham City Art Museum before meeting Vicki Vale.

The song was inspired by Prince's meeting with Jack Nicholson on-set during the filming of Batman. Prince remarked in a 1990 interview, "[Nicholson] had this attitude that reminded me of Morris [Day] — and there was that song."

The upbeat and humorous number features horn samples and Prince's sped-up "Camille" vocals, as well as a vocal performance by Anna Fantastic. The 12" single extends the song to about six minutes in length (labeled as the "Video Mix"), and features the B-side "Feel U Up", a previously unreleased Camille track which would later be available on The Hits/The B-Sides compilation. "Feel U Up" was originally cut in 1981, but re-recorded in 1986 for the Camille album.

The 12" single also included a "Purple Party Mix", which starts with a string of samples from Prince's earlier hits and contains different lyrics. A track identified as a "music mix" is an instrumental of the "Purple Party Mix". The bassline shares great similarities to "Talking Loud and Saying Nothing" by James Brown. The song's chant "young and old, gather round; everybody hail the new king in town" follows the same rhythm from the 1986 outtake "Rebirth of the Flesh".

Chart performance
The song became the only Batman single to perform better in the UK, where it peaked at number 14, than in the US, where it peaked at number 18.

Music video
The song's accompanying music video, directed by Albert Magnoli, again presents Prince's "Gemini" alter ego dressed in a "half-Joker" costume. The video features Dutch musician Candy Dulfer on saxophone. Due to licensing problems, "Partyman", like all of the Batman-era hits, has failed to appear on any Prince compilation album with the exception of the UK singles promoting The Hits/The B-Sides. The song's streams increased when it was featured in an episode of the 2020 documentary series The Last Dance.

Formats and track listings
 7-inch single
 "Partyman" – 3:11
 "Feel U Up" (Short Stroke) – 3:44

 12-inch single (US)
 "Partyman" (The Purple Party Mix) – 6:02
 "Partyman" (Partyman Music Mix) – 4:31
 "Partyman" (The Video Mix) – 6:20
 "Feel U Up" (Short Stroke) – 3:44

 12-inch single (UK)
 "Partyman" (Video Mix) – 6:20
 "Feel U Up" (Long Stroke) – 6:28

Charts

Usage in media
The song was used in episode 3 of the Netflix documentary series The Last Dance.

References

Prince (musician) songs
1989 singles
Batman (1989 film series)
Batman music
Songs written by Prince (musician)
Warner Records singles
Songs written for films
1989 songs
Song recordings produced by Prince (musician)